The 2003–04 SuperBest Ligaen season was the 47th season of ice hockey in Denmark. Nine teams participated in the league, and Esbjerg IK won the championship.

Regular season

Playoffs

External links
Season on hockeyarchives.info

Dan
Eliteserien (Denmark) seasons
2003 in Danish sport
2004 in Danish sport